Marie Steiner-von Sivers (14 March 1867 – 27 December 1948) was a Baltic German actress, the second wife of Rudolf Steiner and one of his closest colleagues. She made a great contribution to the development of anthroposophy, particularly in her work on the renewal of the performing arts (eurythmy, speech and drama), and the editing and publishing of Rudolf Steiner's literary estate.

Life and work
Marie Steiner-von Sivers was born to an aristocratic family in Włocławek (then part of Imperial Russia). She was well-educated and was fluent in Russian, German, English, French and Italian. She studied theater and recitation with several teachers in Europe.

Relationship to Rudolf Steiner
Von Sivers "appeared one day" at one of Rudolf Steiner's early lectures in 1900. In the autumn of 1901, she posed the question to Steiner, "Would it be possible to create a spiritual movement based on European tradition and the impetus of Christ?" Rudolf Steiner later reported:With this, I was given the opportunity to act in a way that I had only previously imagined. The question had been put to me, and now, according to spiritual laws, I could begin to answer it.

Steiner-von Sivers collaborated with Steiner for the rest of Steiner's life and carried his work beyond his death in 1925 until her own death in 1948. She accompanied him and helped him as secretary, translator, editor, and organizer of his lecture tours and other public activities. She assisted Steiner's work with her own resources and in 1908 founded the Philosophical-Theosophical Press (later Philosophical-Anthroposophical) to publish Steiner's work.

On 24 December 1914, she married Rudolf Steiner. Anna Eunicke Steiner, Steiner's first wife, had died in 1911. Beginning in 1914, Steiner drew up a succession of wills naming Marie Steiner-von Sivers as heir to his entire work and property and his successor in the leadership of the anthroposophical movement.

Eurythmy and speech formation
Starting in 1912, Rudolf Steiner developed the art of eurythmy. With Steiner-von Sivers' guidance, it developed in three directions: as a stage art, as an integral part of Waldorf pedagogy, and as a therapeutic method. Under her tutelage, two schools of eurythmy were founded, in Berlin and in Dornach, Switzerland.

Steiner-von Sivers, who had been trained in recitation and elocution, and made a study of purely artistic speaking. She gave introductory poetry recitals at Steiner's lectures and assisted him in the development of the four Mystery Dramas (1910–1913). With her help, Steiner conducted several speech and drama courses with the aim of raising these forms to the level of true art.

Politics

According to fellow anthroposophist Hans Büchenbacher, Steiner-von Sivers was "completely pro-Nazi." She, Guenther Wachsmuth, and Albert Steffen, had publicly expressed sympathy for the Nazi regime since its beginnings; led by such sympathies of their leadership, the Swiss and German Anthroposophical organizations chose for a path conflating accommodation with collaboration, which in the end ensured that while the Nazi regime hunted the esoteric organizations, Gentile Anthroposophists from Nazi Germany and countries occupied by it were let be to a surprising extent. Of course they had some setbacks from the enemies of Anthroposophy among the upper echelons of the Nazi regime, but Anthroposophists also had loyal supporters among them, so overall Gentile Anthroposophists were not badly hit by the Nazi regime. When Rudolf Hess defected to UK, their most powerful protector was gone, but Anthroposophists were still not left without supporters among higher-placed Nazis.

See also
Édouard Schuré

References

Biographical resources
Marie Savitch, Marie Steiner-von Sivers: Fellow worker with Rudolf Steiner, London: Rudolf Steiner Press, 1967; .
Hans Peter van Manen, Marie Steiner: Her place in world karma, London: Temple Lodge, 1995; .
Wilfried Hammacher, Marie Steiner: Lebensspuren einer Individualität, Stuttgart: Verlag Freies Geistesleben, 1998 (German); .

External links
Biography (German)
History of the Rudolf Steiner Nachlassverwaltung (German)

1867 births
1948 deaths
Baltic-German people
People from Włocławek
Anthroposophists
Place of death missing